Posy Fossil is a character in the book Ballet Shoes and its two adaptations. She was adopted by Professor Matthew Brown, called Gum, who offered to take her from her mother, a dancer. She is portrayed by Sarah Prince (in the 1975 television adaption) and by Lucy Boynton (in the 2007 film adaptation). She was created by Noel Streatfeild in 1936.

Posy's story 
Posy's father died shortly after her birth, and her young mother, who was a dancer, didn't have time for a baby. She was then adopted by Professor Matthew Brown, called Gum, as a sister for two babies he had already brought home; unlike the others, she arrived with a name. Posy grew up in London, England, and unlike her sisters never attended school. Posy is notable for her ginger curls and small size; as the youngest, she is boisterous and often self-centred, and Pauline and Petrova often feel they have to 'sit' on her in order to teach her a little bit of humility (though this usually has a limited effect). What her sisters see as arrogance is to a large extent Posy's confidence in her extraordinary ability as a dancer (apparent from a very young age). Besides dancing, she has a great talent for mimicry that often helps in times of stress. Posy is also the inheritor of the titular ballet shoes, a parting gift from her birth mother. Of the three sisters she is perhaps the most gifted and dedicated to her art.

She was only six when she became a student at the Children's Academy of Dancing and Stage Training. Posy was in the elementary class, but due to her talent for dance, she became a student of Madame Fidolia, the headmistress of the school. Under her training, Posy's talent increases and she soon becomes the best dancer in the school, seemingly destined be a prima ballerina when she grows up. Unlike Pauline and Petrova, she is rarely concerned about their lack of funds, convinced there will always be enough money to allow her to continue dancing. Her drive to dance often makes her insensitive to other people's problems - for instance, when Madame Fidolia suffers a stroke, Posy states that she isn't as worried about the wellbeing of her teacher as about who was going to teach her from then on. No longer being under the instruction of the accomplished professor, she secretly went to Manoff, a famous ballet dancer, and asked to take her on as a pupil. At first he laughed and was not convinced of her abilities but soon changed his mind when he saw her perform and learnt who had taught her.

At the end of the book, Posy is accepted as a pupil by Manoff and moves to Prague, Czechoslovakia (now the Czech Republic) in order to study with him, accompanied by Nana. In later books, she is said to have moved to America at the outbreak of the Second World War and was doing background dance work in Hollywood's films under the pseudonym of 'Posina'. However, Posy kept her aim of being a full-time ballerina, and in the book Apple Bough (the final story of Streatfeild's to feature Madame Fidolia's dance academy), the character Ethel Forum, a talented dancer herself, refers to Posy as 'the greatest dancer in the world'.

Portrayals 
 In Ballet Shoes, a TV serial from 1975, was portrayed by Sarah Prince.
 In 2007 adaptation, Ballet Shoes, she was portrayed by Lucy Boynton.

References

Fossil, Posy
Fictional adoptees
Fictional dancers